The Thunder Bay Thunder Cats was a minor professional ice hockey team based in Thunder Bay, Ontario, Canada, and a member of the United Hockey League. The team went through a number of different names prior to being the Thunder Cats, including the Thunder Bay Thunder Hawks and the Thunder Bay Senators.

History
After the success of the five-time Allan Cup champion Thunder Bay Twins, the Colonial Hockey League (CoHL) took interest in expanding to the Northwestern Ontario city. In 1991, the CoHL introduced the Thunder Bay Thunder Hawks, spelling the end of the 21-year Twins franchise that stepped aside for the new minor professional team.  In 1993, the team changed its name to the Thunder Bay Senators to reflect the teams affiliation with the National Hockey League's Ottawa Senators. After three season as the Senators, the team became the Thunder Bay Thunder Cats in 1996. The CoHL changed its name to the United Hockey League (UHL) in 1997.

After eight seasons in Thunder Bay, the Thunder Cats were bought, moved to Rockford, Illinois, and renamed the Rockford IceHogs in 1999.

Season-by-season results

External links
International Hockey League History

 
Defunct ice hockey teams in Canada
Ice hockey teams in Ontario
1991 establishments in Ontario
1999 disestablishments in Ontario
Ottawa Senators minor league affiliates
Winnipeg Jets minor league affiliates
Ice hockey clubs established in 1991
Ice hockey clubs disestablished in 1999